Eddy de Pretto (born 2 May 1993 in Créteil in the Val-de-Marne) is a French singer-songwriter and actor.

Early life 
Eddy de Pretto was born on 2 May 1993 and grew up in Créteil in the Val-de-Marne. His father is a truck driver and football fan; his mother a laboratory technician and an art lover. He sings about his native city in Beaulieue. In an interview, he described his hometown:

At the age of twelve, he started lessons in theatre, singing, vocal technique and piano: "I took the TV remote for a microphone and operated a halogen lamp for lighting. So my mother suggested taking theatre lessons since I didn't excel at sport." He continued his education at the Institut supérieur des arts de la scène (ECM-ISAS, "Advanced Institute of Dramatic Arts") in Paris.

Acting 
Eddy de Pretto's first acting experiences were in TV advertisements, such as the role of a young Julius Caesar for CanalSat in September 2010, before entering into the theatrical and film worlds: the short films Königsberg by Philipp Mayrhofer in 2012 and Vivre sa vie by Paul D. Meyer in 2013 as well as an appearance in the feature film Paulette by Jérôme Enrico in the role of "the young hippy buyer", also in 2013.

Music career 
Between the ages of eighteen and nineteen he began to write songs. In his first public performance he sang R. Kelly's "I Believe I Can Fly" at his local youth centre (Maison des jeunes et de la culture): "I was totally weak, ... so stressed out because there was a lot of rap and I didn't fit into that genre at all," he said in an interview.

He participated in the Printemps de Bourges music festival, where he won the Inouïs ("unheard of, amazing") prize, and the Bars en Trans festival, and is a graduate of inRocKs Lab 2016. In October 2017, he also took part in the Festival Off Off Off (Nuits de Champagne festival) in Troyes.

Kid and Cure 
He released his first EP, entitled Kid, on 6 October 2017. In the live performances of the EP he played sound clips from his iPhone connected with a cable. The only live musician at his concerts was a drummer.

In early January 2018, on the stage of the television program Taratata, he sang "Comme un boomerang" in duet with Julien Doré, a song written by Serge Gainsbourg and previously performed by Dani and Étienne Daho in 2001.

In mid-January 2018, he launched "Random", the first song from his debut album , describing his heartaches.

Along with Gaël Faye and Fishbach, he was nominated for "Best Newcomer Stage Act" (Groupe ou artiste révélation scène) at the 33rd Victoires de la Musique in 2018. Gaël Faye won the award.

In mid-February 2018, he introduced his song "Ego" with "a stripped down, mechanical instrumental", which the singer explained thus: "I set down the possibility of becoming unhinged because of the speed at which the project is going. By dint of hearing praise, the 'excess of self' implodes, and that's the risk I'm exposing here. The simple fear of degenerating into a fanaticism of the self through social media, endearments, and all other flattering signals that create this monster of ego."

On 2 March 2018, he released his first album , on CD, vinyl and in digital format. At the same time, the clip for "Normal" was unveiled, which took on stereotypes of sexual identity, fear of the other and homophobia: "An anger about people who were attacking me because they didn't like the person I embodied," he explained in the magazine Têtu. A week after its release, the recording was ranked the number one best-selling album ahead of Vous et moi by Julien Doré, with 13,500 copies, "driving out" Grand Corps Malade from Fnac's Top French Albums listing.

À TOUS LES BÂTARDS 

On 25 March 2021, he released his new album entitled À TOUS LES BÂTARDS, featuring his two previously released singles, Bateaux-Mouches and Désolé Caroline, alongside a COLORS SHOW performance of the song ‘Parfaitement’ which was released on YouTube ahead of the album's release. The 16-track album featured an artwork given to de Pretto by a fan, the design of which shows the sketch of the artist's head superimposed onto a yellow background, a trend continued from his previous album's cover where he superimposed bodybuilder Arnold Schwarzenegger’s arm onto an image of himself.

Personal life 
As alluded to in some of his songs, Eddy de Pretto does not hide his homosexuality: "I'm not militant. I don't want to be a standard-bearer. I just want to give an account of my life, my reality," he added in an interview. He defines himself as a "non-genre" artist. In the TV program Taratata, broadcast on 15 December 2017, he explained that he was trying to examine masculinity and the hypermasculinity that made up part of his education. When Nagui asked him if he talked about homosexuality in his songs, he responded that that was in no way his goal. In this regard, speaking to Les Inrockuptibles the singer declared: "I try to speak about my personal history and to normalise it as much as possible. And not to highlight it saying I'm the first queer to link rap and French chanson".

Musical influences

Discography

Album

EP

Singles

Other charting songs

Covers 
 2017: "Je suis pas fou" by Jul
 2017: "Du bout des lèvres" by Barbara
 2018: "Comme un boomerang" by Serge Gainsbourg (duet with Julien Doré)

Filmography

Feature films

Short films

Awards and nominations

References

External links 
 
 

French singer-songwriters
21st-century French singers
French rappers
1993 births
Living people
Rappers from Val-de-Marne
French LGBT singers